Theodore Ernest Ferris (August 17, 1872 – May 30, 1953) was an American naval architect and engineer responsible for the "Ferris Designs" used by the US Emergency Fleet Corporation, of the United States Shipping Board, during World War I.

Early life
Ferris was born in Stamford, Connecticut, the son of Nathaniel Betts and Louise (Keeler) Ferris. He was educated in Stamford and later at the Greenwich Academy, where he took a technical training course. After a period of employment at shipyards on Long Island, he joined the Townsend-Downey Company on Shooters Island and later the firm of Cary Smith & Ferris.

Emergency Fleet Corporation
In 1917, the Emergency Fleet Corporation (EFC) was established by the United States Shipping Board under General Goethals with Ferris as chief architect. His 3,500-deadweight-ton Design 1001 ship (known as the "Ferris Design") wooden steamship became the model for the EFC, of which 63 were subsequently built. He also invented a system of steel strapping for fixing the frames of his ships.

Personal life
Ferris married Lois Davis on August 25, 1912. They had two children, Nathaniel James and Theodore Louis Ferris.

He died in Wallington, New Jersey, on May 30, 1953.

Legacy
In his obituary, The New York Times repeated an estimate that US shipyards built over 1,800 ships to his designs.

The 55-meter schooner Shenandoah is still sailing today.

Works

References

External links
The Ferris wooden cargo ships of World War I

1872 births
1953 deaths
Engineers from Connecticut
American naval architects
American yacht designers
People from Stamford, Connecticut
20th-century American engineers